Murdashevo (Mırźaş) is a rural locality (a selo) in Ayuchevsky Selsoviet, Sterlitamaksky District, Bashkortostan, Russia. The population was 185 as of 2010. There are 2 streets.

Geography 
Murdashevo is located 35 km south of Sterlitamak (the district's administrative centre) by road. Romadanovka is the nearest rural locality.

References 

Rural localities in Sterlitamaksky District